This is a list of  rivers on the Indian Ocean island of Réunion:

A
 Rivière d'Abord
 Ravine de l'Anse
 Ravine des Avirons
B
 Ravine Basse Vallée
 Ravine Bernica
 Ravine du Butor
C
 Ravine des Cabris
 Ravine des Cafres
 Ravine du Cap
 Ravine Charpentier
 Ravine du Chaudron
 Ravine des Chèvres
 Bras des Chevrettes
 Bras de Cilaos
 Ravine des Citrons Galets
 Ravine des Colimaçons
E
 Ravine de l'Ermitage
 Rivière de l'Est
F
 Ravine Fleurimont
 Rivière des Fleurs Jaunes
G
 Rivière des Galets
 Ravine du Gol
 Ravine de la Grande Chaloupe
 Grande Ravine
J
 Ravine à Jacques
L
 Rivière Langevin
M
 Ravine à Malheur
 Ravine Manapany
 Rivière des Marsouins
 Rivière du Mât
N
 Ruisseau des Noirs
O
 Ravine des Orangers
P
 Ravine des Patates à Durand
 Ravine du Petit Saint-Pierre
 Petite Ravine
 Ravine de Petite-Île
 Bras de la Plaine
 Rivière des Pluies
 Ravine du Pont
 Ravine des Poux
R
 Rivière des Remparts
 Rivière des Roches
S
 Rivière Saint-Denis
 Rivière Saint-Étienne
 Ravine Saint-François
 Ravine Saint-Gilles
 Grande Rivière Saint-Jean
 Rivière Sainte-Anne
 Rivière Sainte-Marie
 Rivière Sainte-Suzanne
 Ravine Sèche
T
 Ravine de Takamaka
 Ravine des Trois-Bassins
 Ravine du Trou
 Trou Blanc

 
Rivers of Réunion